Dendrobium bracteosum (bracted dendrobium) is a species of orchid. It is native to New Guinea, the Bismarck Archipelago and the Indonesian Province of Maluku.

References

bracteosum
Orchids of Oceania
Orchids of Indonesia
Orchids of New Guinea
Orchids of Papua New Guinea
Flora of the Maluku Islands
Flora of the Bismarck Archipelago
Plants described in 1886